Alfieri is an Italian surname. Notable people with the surname include:

 Anastase Alfieri (1892–1971), Italian entomologist
 Benedetto Alfieri (1700–1767), Italian architect
 Carmine Alfieri (born 1943), Italian Camorra boss
 Cesare Alfieri di Sostegno (1799–1869), Italian politician and diplomat
 Dino Alfieri (1886–1966), Italian fascist politician
 Edoardo Alfieri (1913–1998), Italian sculptor
 Blessed Enrichetta Alfieri (1891-1951) - Italian Roman Catholic professed religious
 Francesco Alfieri, 17th-century master of swordsmanship
 Giulio Alfieri (1924–2002), Italian automobile engineer
 Martino Alfieri (1590–1641), Apostolic Nuncio to Cologne from 1634 to 1639
 Nick Alfieri (born 1992), American football linebacker
 Pietro Alfieri (1801–1863), Roman Catholic priest and Camaldolese monk
 Richard Alfieri (born 1948), American playwright, screenplay writer, novelist, producer, and actor
 Victor Alfieri (born 1971), American actor and writer
 Vittorio Alfieri (1749–1803), Italian dramatist and poet
 Vittorio Luigi Alfieri (1863–1918), Italian military officer

See also
Alfieri (disambiguation)

References

Italian-language surnames